Penthicodes farinosus is a species of planthoppers in the subfamily Aphaeninae (Fulgoridae): with five subspecies distributed in Indo-China and Malesia. The genus name was formerly treated as feminine, but in 2022 it was revised to masculine in accordance with ICZN Article 30.1.4.4, changing the spelling of this species' name from farinosa to farinosus.

Subspecies
 P. farinosus aerugineus (Stål, 1870)
 P. farinosus farinosus (Weber, 1801)
 P. farinosus leucosticticus (White, 1845)
 P. farinosus niasensis Schmidt, 1923
 P. farinosus tullia (Breddin, 1901)

Gallery

References

Notes

External links

FLOW: Penthicodes (Penthicodes) farinosa (Weber, 1801)

Hemiptera of Asia
Aphaeninae